Pylon may refer to:

Structures and boundaries
 Pylon (architecture), the gateway to the inner part of an Ancient Egyptian temple or Christian cathedral
 Pylon, a support tower structure for suspension bridges or highways
 Pylon, an orange marker designating a corner of an American football end zone
 Aircraft pylon, an external mount for equipment such as engines and weapons
 Electricity pylon, a steel lattice tower used to support an overhead power line
 Traffic pylon, a cone-shaped marker that is placed on roads or footpaths to temporarily redirect traffic
 Traction current pylon

Arts, entertainment, and media
 Pylon (album), a 2015 album by Killing Joke
 Pylon (band), a rock band from Athens, Georgia, US
 Pylon (novel), a 1935 novel by William Faulkner
 Pylon (film) or The Tarnished Angels, a 1957 movie based on the novel
 Pylon (StarCraft), a structure used by the Protoss race in the StarCraft universe

Other uses
 Pylon turn, a flight maneuver in which an aircraft banks into a circular turn around a fixed spot on the ground
 Pylons project, a set of open source web application frameworks written in Python

See also
 Pylon Peak (disambiguation), several mountains
 Overhead line pylon (disambiguation)
 
 
 Pilon (disambiguation)
 Pylos, a town in Greece